Baghdati is a district of Georgia, in the region of Imereti. Its main town is Baghdati. In Baghdati municipality there is one city and 25 villages. The center of the municipality is 25 kilometers away from the city of Kutaisi

Etymology
According to one version, the name Baghdati is derived from the Old Persian language. Its correct form is Baghdad.  On April 14, 1940, in Baghdad 10 years after the death of Vladimir Mayakovsky, Baghdad was changed as an administrative unit and renamed Mayakovsky, which it held until the late 1990s. it was later reinstated to his old name.

History
According to the available data, the name Baghdati is first mentioned in historical sources in the early 18th century. It was here that the fortress of Baghdad was built by the ottomans. Earlier, this place was called Tkhmeli Castle. The oldest place in the territory of Baghdati municipality is the village of Dimi, where the first king of Georgia, Parnavaz established a supervisory fortification building.

Politics
Baghdati Municipal Assembly (Georgian: ბაღდათის საკრებულო) is a representative body in Baghdati Municipality, consisting of 27 members and elected every four years. The last election was held in October 2021.

Notable natives

Many famous people were born in Baghdad, among whom are especially noteworthy: the founder of Russian avant-garde, famous artist, actor, screenwriter and playwright Vladimir Mayakovsky, composer Rezo Laghidze, academician Albert Tavkhelidze, Director Rezo Chkheidze, professor of psychiatry and musician Zurab Chikovani, conductor Jansug Kakhidze, writer and critic Jansug Gvinjilia, poet Zaal Ebanoidze, academician in the field of metallurgy Guram Kashakashvili and others.

Gallery

See also 
 List of municipalities in Georgia (country)

References

External links 
 Districts of Georgia, Statoids.com

Municipalities of Imereti